Playhouse Disney Hong Kong is a Playhouse Disney-branded pay cable television channel for viewers in Hong Kong based in Kowloon Peninsula and is available in three national languages: English, Cantonese and Mandarin. This channel is only available on Cable TV Hong Kong in Hong Kong on Channel 136, Now TV in Hong Kong on Channel 442 and HKBN bbTV in Hong Kong on Channel 312. The previous name for Playhouse Disney Hong Kong was Disney Channel Asia. English, Cantonese and Mandarin languages are available 24 hours daily.

Availability

Television stations in Hong Kong
Television channels and stations established in 2005
2005 establishments in Hong Kong
Television channels and stations disestablished in 2011
2011 disestablishments in Hong Kong